The 1990 United States Senate election in Alaska was held on November 6, 1990. Incumbent Republican United States Senator Ted Stevens sought re-election to a fifth term in the United States Senate, which he won easily, besting his opponents in a landslide.

Open primary

Candidates

Democratic 
 Michael Beasley, perennial candidate
 Tom Taggart

Republican 
 Ted Stevens, incumbent United States Senator since 1968
 Robert M. Bird, anti-abortion activist

Results

General election

Results

See also 
 1990 United States Senate elections

References 

Alaska
1990
1990 Alaska elections